The Faculty of Arts of The University of Hong Kong (HKU) is one of the oldest faculty in the University of Hong Kong, and is considered to be one of Asia's best Arts and Humanities faculties.

History 

The Faculty of Arts, along with the Faculty of Engineering and Faculty of Medicine, are one of the first Faculties of the University of Hong Kong when it was established in 1912. Professor A.E. Wrottesley-Salt, elected in September 1913, was the first Dean of Arts.

Degrees offered 

The Faculty comprises four Schools and three Centres:
 School of Chinese
 School of English
 School of Humanities
 School of Modern Languages and Cultures
 Centre for Applied English Studies
 Centre for the Humanities and Medicine
 Centre of Buddhist Studies,

The Faculty offers a 4-year Bachelor of Arts program, three 5-year double-degree programs: BA - BEd in Language Education - Chinese, BA - BEd in Language Education - English and BA in Literary Studies - LLB in conjunction with other faculties of the university. It also offers various research postgraduate programs, including MA, MFA, MPhil and PhD.

Notable alumni 

 Anson Chan, former Chief Secretary in British Hong Kong and the Hong Kong SAR government
 Edward Chen, former President of Lingnan University of Hong Kong	
 Alex Law Kai-Yui, Hong Kong film director, screenwriter and producer	
 Mabel Cheung, Hong Kong film director	
 Eileen Chang, modern Chinese writer	
 Rafael HUI Si-yan, former Chief Secretary for Administration of Hong Kong	
 Sir Yuet-keung Kan, Hong Kong banker, politician and lawyer	
 Li Tse-fong, Hong Kong entrepreneur and politician	
 Frederick Ma Si-hang, former Secretary for Commerce and Economic Development of the Hong Kong SAR government	
 Rita Lau Ng Wai-lan, former Secretary for Commerce and Economic Development of the Hong Kong SAR government	
 Dr Margaret Ng Ngoi-yee, Hong Kong politician, barrister, writer and columnist	
 James Wong, a Cantopop lyricist and songwriter

Notable professors 
 John Carroll, Associate Dean (Global) of the Faculty, author of A Concise History of Hong Kong
 Adam Jaworski, Associate Dean (Research) of the Faculty
 Yang Binbin, Associate Dean (Teaching & Learning) of the Faculty
 Wai Ting Siok, Associate Dean (Postgraduate) of the Faculty
 Song Gang, Associate Dean (Undergraduate) of the Faculty
 David Pomfret, Head of the School of Humanities
 Julia Kuehn, Head of the School of English

See also 
 The University of Hong Kong
 CUHK Faculty of Arts

References

External links 

University of Hong Kong